The Lunda rope squirrel (Funisciurus bayonii)  is a species of rodent in the family Sciuridae. It is found in Angola and Democratic Republic of the Congo. Its natural habitat is moist savanna.

References

Funisciurus
Rodents of Africa
Mammals described in 1890
Taxonomy articles created by Polbot